Hossein Omoumi (born 1944) is an Iranian-born master musician of the ney (reed flute), composer, scholar, and teacher of Persian traditional music. He is the Maseeh Professor in Persian Performing Arts in the department of music within the Claire Trevor School of the Arts, at the University of California, Irvine (UCI).

Biography 
Omoumi started studying at the age of 14 the ney, the traditional reed flute of Iran; and studied music under ney master Hassan Kassai. Early in his career he taught at the National Conservatory of Music in Iran. In 1972, he received a PhD in architecture from the University of Florence. In 1984, he moved to Paris where he taught at Sorbonne University.

He has performed at many concerts and music festivals as a player of the ney. He is also known for original work with Persian traditional drums, particularly the tombak and daf. In 1997, Omoumi played the ney for The Sweet Hereafter soundtrack (1997).

His students have included Alireza Ghorbani, and Hesam Abedini.

References

University of California, Irvine faculty
Iranian flautists
Living people
1944 births
University of Florence alumni
Musicians from Isfahan